The BBC One "Oneness" idents were a set of on-screen channel identities used on BBC One from December 2016 through April 2022; soft launched with the channel's Christmas presentation, and officially launched on 1 January 2017, the idents largely featured scenes of people performing everyday activities across various locations in the United Kingdom. The idents were developed by BBC Creative in collaboration with photographer Martin Parr.

The idents were used until the evening of 1 April 2022, when they were replaced with the 'Lens' idents.

Launch
Street photographer Martin Parr was commissioned by BBC One to create the idents. The "Oneness" theme had first been exhibited the previous Christmas for the channel's identity, hence giving the impression that those idents ultimately served as a preview to the new look that made its full launch on New Year's Day 2017. Around 24 idents were filmed, and were introduced throughout the year. More idents were introduced throughout 2018.

This is the first set of idents that have been produced with the input of BBC Creative, a new in house creative agency responsible for BBC presentation.

Components of look
Each ident began with a tagline showing who the people are and what they are doing, and the location of where the ident is filmed. At the bottom of the screen, the word "Oneness" was drawn up before fading into the BBC One logo. Programme trailers retained the same look and design of the previous 'Circle' era, except the endboards now consist of a plain red background as opposed to a one with a circular design as before. Some of the idents also seemed to have been inspired/echo the themes of the past 'Rhythm & Movement' ones from before the "Circle" Era. End credits promotional material is changed. The idents were also played without voiceovers, the BBC One logo and the activity and location during regional news-opts on BBC One HD, as regional news programmes are not available on BBC One HD for financial and technical reasons.

Following the corporate rebrand of BBC in October 2021, most of the Oneness idents were retired. The ones that remained were modified to suit new transition devices concurrently introduced, with the "Oneness" logo retired, and the new BBC One logo split between the top- and bottom-centre of the screen. The rest of the idents were retired in 2022, when BBC One changed their idents.

Original set (2017–2020; 2021–2022)

2020 UK lockdown idents (2020–2021) 

In recognition of the COVID-19 pandemic, BBC One introduced a new "lockdown"-themed series of Oneness idents on 1 May 2020, temporarily replacing the existing Oneness idents. Unlike other Oneness idents, they are presented as collages of themed scenes filmed in a variety of locations across the UK, rather than as a group of people in a single location. The idents were intended to "reflect what we're all going through".

The idents were discontinued on 19 July 2021 (the date in which England formally lifted most of its COVID-19 restrictions, informally referred to in the press as "Freedom Day"), after which the normal Oneness idents were reintroduced.

Special idents

Christmas idents

Stings

See also

 History of BBC television idents

References

BBC One
BBC Idents
Television presentation in the United Kingdom